Melinda Burge Schwegmann (born October 25, 1946) is an American politician. She was the first woman to serve as Lieutenant Governor of Louisiana and was in office from 1992 to 1996. While in office, she was a proponent of the arts and culture in the state.

She ran unsuccessfully in the 1995 Louisiana gubernatorial election. She was, along with her opponent Mary Landrieu, the first woman to have a serious chance of winning the office. She finished in 6th place out of the 15 running in that year's jungle primary.

In 1997, she celebrated her 51st birthday by winning a seat in the Louisiana House of Representatives. She filled the unexpired term of Garey Forster. She served until 2003, when she switched her political party from a Democrat to become a Republican and ran again for Lt. Governor. She lost, coming in third place.

She is married to John F. Schwegmann. Through marriage, Schwegmann became a member of the family of grocery retailers that owned Schwegmann Brothers Giant Supermarkets.

References

Works cited

Lieutenant Governors of Louisiana
Members of the Louisiana House of Representatives
Women in Louisiana politics
Women state constitutional officers of Louisiana
Living people
1946 births
Louisiana Democrats
Louisiana Republicans